Zlosyň is a municipality and village in Mělník District in the Central Bohemian Region of the Czech Republic. It has about 500 inhabitants.

Geography
It lies in the Central Elbe Table.

History
The first written mention of Zlosyň is from 1316. According to a record from 1654, the village was probably destroyed during the Thirty Years' War and later restored. For centuries, the village was agricultural, but in the 19th century, residents began to commute to work in nearby industrial centres.

Transport
the D8 motorway from Prague to Ústí nad Labem passes through the municipality.

Sights
The main landmark of Zlosyň and the most valuable building is the Baroque granary. In the centre of Zlosyň is a chapel from 1942.

References

External links

Villages in Mělník District